The 1898 Texas gubernatorial election was held to elect the Governor of Texas. Joseph D. Sayers was elected over Barnett Gibbs, a Populist running with Republican support.

General election

Candidates
R. P. Bailey (Prohibition)
Barnett Gibbs, former State Senator from Dallas and acting Governor (Populist)
G. H. Royal (Socialist Labor)
Joseph D. Sayers, U.S. Representative from Bastrop (Democratic)

Campaign
Gibbs, a moderate Populist, primarily campaigned on the issue of building a state-owned "relief railroad" from the Red River to the Gulf of Mexico.

Results

References

1898
Texas
1898 Texas elections